Ruellia angustior (syn. Dipteracanthus beyrichianus var. angustior Nees, Eurychanes angustior (Nees) Lindau) is a plant native of Cerrado vegetation of Brazil. This plant is cited in Flora Brasiliensis by Carl Friedrich Philipp von Martius.

angustior
Flora of Brazil